Diane Waller , President of the British Association of Art Therapists, the emeritus professor of Art Psychotherapy at Goldsmiths, University of London, Vice-President of the International Society for Expression and Art Therapy, a council member of the World Psychiatric Association's Section on Art and Psychiatry, a council member of the Health Professions Council,
Professor Diane Waller was appointed an OBE in the June 2007 Birthday Honours list for services to healthcare.

She has written a book, Waller, Diane. Textiles from the Balkans. "The" British Museum Press, 2010

References

External links 
 baat.org
 

Year of birth missing (living people)
Place of birth missing (living people)
Living people
British psychiatrists
Academics of Goldsmiths, University of London
British women psychiatrists
Officers of the Order of the British Empire